Comandini is an Italian surname. Notable people with the surname include:

Adele Comandini (1898–1987), American screenwriter
Federico Comandini (1893–1967), Italian politician
Gianni Comandini (born 1977), Italian footballer

Italian-language surnames